Jibril Bojang (born 13 September 1994) is a football striker who currently plays for 1. divisjon side Strømmen. Born in Norway, he represents the Gambia national team.

Club career
Bojang is of Gambian descent. He played youth football in Skeid, and made his first-team debut in the last match of the 2010 season. From 2011 he played junior football for Vålerenga for two and a half seasons, before joining Drøbak-Frogn in the summer of 2013. In 2014, he returned to Skeid, spending one and a half season there. In late 2015 he played for Grorud, and in early 2016 for Lørenskog. In July 2016 he was signed by top-tier club Start, and made his debut in a 2–4 home loss against Vålerenga.

Bojang had featured for Vålerenga's first team in a 2013 friendly match. Prior to joining Start, Bojang also negotiated a transfer with Mjøndalen IF, Kristiansund BK and Falkenbergs FF. Ahead of the 2017 season, on the last day of the winter transfer window, he did join Mjøndalen IF.

International
He made his Gambia national football team debut on 12 June 2019 in a friendly against Morocco, as a 62nd-minute substitute for Sulayman Bojang.

External links

References

1994 births
Living people
Footballers from Oslo
People with acquired Gambian citizenship
Gambian footballers
The Gambia international footballers
Norwegian people of Gambian descent
Norwegian footballers
Norway youth international footballers
Association football forwards
Skeid Fotball players
Drøbak-Frogn IL players
IK Start players
Eliteserien players
Mjøndalen IF players
Norwegian First Division players